Jorge Agustín Rodríguez (born 15 September 1995) is an Argentine professional footballer who plays as a defensive midfielder for Argentine Primera División side Estudiantes.

Career
Rodríguez got his career underway with Argentine Primera División side Banfield in 2014, making his debut in a 3–0 defeat to Godoy Cruz on 8 August. He made a total of seventeen appearances for Banfield in his first three seasons.

On February 3, 2021, Rodríguez signed a three year contract with Argentine Primera División side Estudiantes.

Career statistics
.

References

External links

1995 births
Living people
Sportspeople from Mendoza, Argentina
Argentine footballers
Association football defenders
Argentine Primera División players
Club Atlético Banfield footballers
Estudiantes de La Plata footballers